The Center for Auto Safety is a Washington, D.C.-based 501(c)(3) consumer advocacy non-profit group focused on the United States automotive industry. Founded in 1970 by Consumers Union and Ralph Nader, the group focuses its efforts on enacting reform though public advocacy and pressuring the National Highway Traffic Safety Administration and automakers through litigation. For decades, it was led by Executive Director Clarence Ditlow, who died in late 2016 from cancer. Ditlow was widely admired in the auto safety community, although he also had detractors among auto manufacturers. The Center for Auto Safety is currently led by Executive Director Jason Levine.

History 

The Center for Auto Safety (the Center) was founded in 1970 by Consumers Union and Ralph Nader as a consumer safety group to protect drivers. Ralph Nader, the author of Unsafe at Any Speed, believed that automakers and the government were not adequately regulating safety. For many years, the Center was led by Clarence Ditlow, a well-known consumer safety advocate. The Center has advocated vigorously for driver safety and automaker accountability by pressuring government agencies and automakers with many lawsuits campaigns. The Center has also published The Car Book annually, which presents the latest safety ratings, dealer prices, fuel economy, insurance premiums, and maintenance costs for new vehicles.

Lemon laws 

The Center for Auto Safety counts the enacting of lemon laws in all 50 states among its greatest successes. The Center has testified over 50 times before Congressional Committees on auto safety, warranties and service bulletins, air pollution, consumer protection, and fuel economy. The Center was the leading consumer advocate in passage of Magnuson-Moss Warranty Act, fuel economy provisions of Energy Policy and Conservation Act and Technical Service Bulletin disclosure in MAP-21. The Center recently succeeded in a lawsuit against DOT Secretary Anthony Foxx, forcing NHTSA to make public all manufacturer communications to dealers regarding safety issues. Additionally, former Center Executive Director Clarence Ditlow and Ralph Nader published The Lemon Book in 1980 to educate drivers on how to avoid buying a "lemon" and what to do if they purchase one.

Recalls 
The Center for Auto Safety has been involved in many campaigns to pressure automakers and NHTSA to issue recalls on dangerous car parts. Throughout its history, the Center has played a major role in numerous recalls including 6.7 million Chevrolets for defective engine mounts, 15 million Firestone 500 tires, 1.5 million Ford Pintos for exploding gas tanks, 3 million Evenflo child seats for defective latches. More recently, the Center was the main proponent for recalls of 7 million Toyotas for sudden acceleration, 2 million Jeeps for fuel tank fires, 11 million GM vehicles for defective ignition switches, and over 60 million exploding Takata airbag inflators.

Accomplishments 
The Center for Auto Safety counts numerous far-reaching efforts among its successes:

 "Lemon laws" enacted in all 50 states
 State laws requiring auto manufacturers to disclose "hidden" warranties to consumers
 The Firestone tire recall
 The Ford Pinto recall due to its dangerous gas tank design
 Exposure of a potentially lethal gas tank design in General Motors pickup trucks
 Improved U.S. highway safety standards administered by the U.S. National Highway Traffic Safety Administration (NHTSA)
 Recall of Jeep vehicles with fuel tanks that could explode in rear impact
 Pressuring General Motors to take action on their faulty airbags and ignition switches
 Annual publication of The Car Book to inform drivers of the safety of specific models
 Better protection for drivers against rollover and roof crush in SUVs
 Maintaining an online database of vehicle safety complaints submitted to the Center
 Wrote Small—On Safety: The Designed-in Dangers of the Volkswagen.

References

External links 
 The Center for Auto Safety—Official website
 The Safe Climate Campaign—Official website

1970 establishments in Washington, D.C.
Automotive safety
Consumer rights organizations
Organizations established in 1970
Political advocacy groups in the United States
Ralph Nader